Marsha Dietlein (born August 1, 1965, in Springfield, Ohio) is an American actress best known for her role as Lucy Wilson in the 1988 zombie horror film Return of the Living Dead Part II.

Career
As well as Return of the Living Dead Part II, Dietlein has appeared in numerous other films including Only You (1992), Mickey Blue Eyes (1999), Boiler Room (2000), Little Manhattan (2005), Little Children (2006), Winter of Frozen Dreams (2009), Nice Guy Johnny (2010), Newlyweds (2011) and The Fitzgerald Family Christmas (2012).

Dietlein has guests starred on numerous TV shows including Herman's Head, Night Court, Walker, Texas Ranger, Matlock, Without a Trace, Gossip Girl, Third Watch,  Law & Order, Law & Order: SVU, Law & Order: Criminal Intent, Ed, and Blue Bloods.

Filmography

Film

Television

References

External links
 

1965 births
Living people
20th-century American actresses
21st-century American actresses
American film actresses
People from Springfield, Ohio